Jul i Kvinnaböske is a 1986 Christmas album by Hasse Andersson, accompanied by the Kvinnaböske Band, and many of the songs have lyrics related to peace. The album peaked at number 27 on the Swedish Albums Chart. In 1987, it was re-released to CD.

Track listing

Side 1
Decembernatt
Julens klockor (Bells of Christmas)
Tomten (till Inger)
Sjömansjul på Hawaii
Stilla natt (Stille Nacht, heilige Nacht)

Side 2
Knalle Juls vals
Var é Tomten (I Believe in Santa)
När juldagsmorgon glimmar
Den fjärde vise mannen
Hoppets vind (Soleado)
Julestök (Outro)

Contributors
Hasse Andersson – vocals
Ulf B. Edefuhr – steel guitar
Sven-Åke (Blöffe) Lindeberg – electric guitar
Hasse Rosén – guitar
Håkan Nyberg – drums
Nils (Nisse "bas") Persson – bass
Caj Högberg – bass
Roland Gottlow – keyboard
Kjell Öhman – keyboard & accordion
Lennart Sjöholm – keyboard
Thomas Haglund – violin & mandolin

Others
Lasse Westman, Lennart Sjöholm, Monica Svensson,
Diana Nunez, Lotta Engberg and Liza Öhman – choir
Producer & arrangement: Lennart Sjöholm

Charts

References 

Hasse Andersson albums
1986 Christmas albums
Christmas albums by Swedish artists
Country Christmas albums
Swedish-language albums